Moto G 5G Plus and Motorola One 5G are Android phablets developed by Motorola Mobility, a subsidiary of Lenovo. The Moto G 5G Plus was announced in July 2020 for Europe; the Motorola One 5G was announced in September 2020 for the United States. A version with mmWave support followed in October, exclusive to Verizon.

References 

Android (operating system) devices
Mobile phones introduced in 2020
Mobile phones with multiple rear cameras
Motorola smartphones
Mobile phones with 4K video recording